X-raid is a private German rally team based in Trebur. It has been competing in cross-country rallies since 2002, including the Dakar Rally. The company is based in Trebur near Frankfurt am Main. Since 2002, vehicles for the Dakar Rally and individual cross-country rally events worldwide as well as the FIA World Cup for Cross-Country Rallies have been developed and built there. The X-raid team has won thirteen World Cup titles since its inception and the car category of the legendary Dakar Rally in 2012, 2013, 2014, 2015, 2020, and 2021.

Successes
Winner of the Cross Country Championship Portugal

Winner of the Silk Way Rally

Winner of the FIA World Cup for Cross-Country Bajas

Winner of the FIA Cross Country Rally World Cup

Winner of the FIA World Cup for Cross-Country Rallies

Winner of the Dakar Rally

Placements at the Dakar Rally
Paris-Dakar 2005 (Africa)

Paris-Dakar 2006 (Africa)

Paris-Dakar 2007 (Africa)

Dakar 2009 (Argentina, Chile)

Dakar 2010 (Argentina, Chile)

Dakar 2011 (Argentina, Chile)

Dakar 2012 (Argentina, Chile, Peru)

Dakar 2013 (Argentina, Chile, Peru)

Dakar 2014 (Argentina, Bolivia, Chile)

Dakar 2015 (Argentina, Bolivia, Chile)

Dakar 2016 (Argentina, Bolivia, Chile)

Dakar 2017 (Argentina, Bolivia, Paraguay)

Dakar 2018 (Peru, Bolivia, Argentina)

Dakar 2019 (Peru)

Dakar 2020 (Saudi Arabia)

Dakar 2021 (Saudi-Arabia)

Dakar 2022 (Saudi-Arabia)

Dakar 2023 (Saudi-Arabia) - car category

Dakar 2023 (Saudi-Arabien) - T3 Kategorie

See also
 BMW Motorsport
 Mini John Cooper Works WRC

References

External links
 Official site

German auto racing teams
Dakar rally racing teams